Aminuddin Ihsan is a former Bruneian commander of the Royal Brunei Armed Forces who serves from 2009 until 2014 and also the Minister of Culture, Youth and Sports from 2018 until 2022.

Biography

Early life and education 
Aminuddin Ihsan was born on 23 July 1966 and graduated with a Bachelor of Science degree in civil engineering and a Master of Arts degree in military studies. He later attended courses such as the United Nations Military Observer (UNMO) and Staff Officer Course, the Battalion Tactics Course and the Joint Staff Course in the United Kingdom. It is notable that he obtained fellowship while in the Australian Defence & Strategic Studies.

Military career 
On 19 September 1988, he was officially commissioned into the Royal Brunei Land Forces as a lieutenant. Aminuddin took up many positions during his military career such as a platoon leader of Company 'D' 1st Battalion (1Bn RBLF), troop leader of the Auxiliary Battalion, commanding officer in the Infantry Battalion, deputy commanding officer and commanding officer of the 2nd Battalion (2Bn RBLF), Commander of the RBAF Training Institute and the Commander of the RBLF. On 31 December 2009, he was appointed as the 8th Commander of the RBAF by succeeding Major General Halbi bin Mohammad Yussof. Aminuddin would then be succeeded by Mohammad Tawih on 29 January 2014.

Political career 
After retirement from the military, he carried out diplomatic tasks as the Brunei High Commissioner to the United Kingdom from 15 May 2014 until 30 January 2018. On 12 November 2014, Queen Elizabeth II presented credentials to high commissioner Aminuddin at Buckingham Palace, London. On 24 April 2017, Aminuddin Ihsan was named the 2017 Diplomat of the Year from Asia category during the Tata DIPLOMAT magazine Awards Ceremony.

On 30 January 2018, Aminuddin became the Minister of Culture, Youth and Sports after an announcement regarding the cabinet reshuffle was made by the Sultan Hassanal Bolkiah. After another cabinet reshuffle on 7 June 2022, he would then be succeeded by Nazmi Mohamad as the Minister.

Personal life 
Aminuddin Ihsan is married to Datin Nurhayana Janis binti Abdullah and they have three children together. He is the son of the late nobleman, Pehin Orang Kaya Saiful Mulok Dato Seri Paduka Awang Haji Abidin bin Orang Kaya Perwira Abdul Rashid.

Awards and honours

Awards 

 2017 Diplomat of the Year from Asia – (24 April 2017)

Honours

National 

  Order of Seri Paduka Mahkota Brunei Third Class (SMB) – (2003)
  Meritorious Service Medal (PJK) – (2007)
  Order of Paduka Keberanian Laila Terbilang First Class (DPKT) – Dato Paduka Seri (15 July 2010)
  Silver Jubilee Medal – (5 October 1992)
  General Service Medal
  Long Service Medal (Armed Forces)
  Royal Brunei Armed Forces Golden Jubilee Medal – (31 May 2011)

Foreign 

 :
  Combat Commander’s Badge – (2005)

 :
  Pingat Jasa Gemilang (PJG) – (9 June 2010)
  Darjah Utama Bakti Cemerlang (DUBC) – (12 April 2012)

 :
  Bintang Yudha Dharma Utama (BYD) – (22 August 2011)

 :
  Panglima Gagah Angkatan Tentera (PGAT) – (4 October 2011)

 :
  Order of the Crown of Thailand Second Class (KCT)

See also 

 Cabinet of Brunei
 Commander of the Armed Forces (Brunei)

References 

1966 births
Living people 
Government ministers of Brunei
Bruneian military leaders
High Commissioners of Brunei to the United Kingdom